Tanaina is a census-designated place (CDP) in the Matanuska-Susitna Borough in the U.S. state of Alaska. Located 4 miles north from Wasilla, it is part of the Anchorage, Alaska Metropolitan Statistical Area. At the 2020 census the population was 8,817, up from 8,197 in 2010. Tanaina is the sixth-most populated CDP in Alaska.

Geography
Tanaina is located at  (61.624211, -149.432817).

Demographics

Tanaina first appeared on the 2000 U.S. Census as a census-designated place (CDP).

As of the census of 2000, there were 4,993 people, 1,609 households, and 1,266 families residing in the CDP. There were 1,700 housing units at an average density of 62.7/sq mi (24.2/km2). The racial makeup of the CDP was 87.9% White, 0.5% Black or African American, 4.7% Native American, 0.6% Asian, <0.1% Pacific Islander, 1.4% from other races, and 4.9% from two or more races.  3.4% of the population were Hispanic or Latino of any race.

There were 1,609 households, out of which 49.9% had children under the age of 18 living with them, 65.9% were married couples living together, 8.6% had a female householder with no husband present, and 21.3% were non-families. 14.9% of all households were made up of individuals, and 1.9% had someone living alone who was 65 years of age or older.  The average household size was 3.10 and the average family size was 3.46.

In the CDP, the population was spread out, with 35.8% under the age of 18, 7.3% from 18 to 24, 32.9% from 25 to 44, 20.9% from 45 to 64, and 3.1% who were 65 years of age or older.  The median age was 32 years. For every 100 females, there were 107.5 males.  For every 100 females age 18 and over, there were 105.2 males.

The median income for a household in the CDP was $64,491, and the median income for a family was $71,629. Males had a median income of $47,917 versus $30,474 for females. The per capita income for the CDP was $23,967.  About 6.1% of families and 7.5% of the population were below the poverty line, including 8.6% of those under age 18 and none of those age 65 or over.

Tanaina's median household income rose to $76,114 in 2010–2014, according to the 2010–2014 American Community Survey.

References

Census-designated places in Alaska
Census-designated places in Matanuska-Susitna Borough, Alaska
Anchorage metropolitan area